The Levern Water, is a small river in East Renfrewshire and Glasgow,  Scotland. It empties into the White Cart River.

The Levern Water facilitated the socioeconomic growth of parts from East Renfrewshire by providing water power for cotton mills as well as homes.

Course
The source of Levern Water is Long Loch in East Renfrewshire, from which it emerges at the north-eastern tip, at coordinates . It flows from there north-west for a short distance, before entering a  reservoir formed by the four sections of the Harelaw Dam. The dam was built in 1844 and is used for trout fishing. The river continues west to the smaller Commore Dam reservoir, from which it emerges due north, gradually turning towards the north-east. It flows past Neilston on the west and north of the town, continuing east from there to Barrhead. After leaving Barrhead, the river runs north-east, forming the boundary between East Renfrewshire and the city of Glasgow, and crossing the Glasgow South Western Line at the Levern Water viaduct, before fully entering Glasgow close to Nitshill, where it also crosses the A726 dual-carriageway. It continues past the suburb of Pollok, and joins the White Cart River near to Crookston Castle, which was where Mary, Queen of Scots fled following the Battle of Langside in 1568.

Viaduct

In 1847, the Glasgow, Barrhead and Neilston Direct Railway built a three-arch viaduct across the river, designed by engineer Neil Robson of Glasgow. The viaduct was constructed using rusticated ashlar blocks. The viaduct has been listed as a Category B site since 17 February 1992. The viaduct also passes over the top of the minor Salterland Road, which has its own Category-C–listed bridge over Levern Water featuring two arches, adjacent to the rail viaduct and built in the 18th century.

See also

List of rivers of Scotland

References

External links
Levern, Cart and Brock Burn – South Glasgow Rivers.

Rivers of East Renfrewshire
Rivers of Glasgow